Otakiri is a rural community just outside Edgecumbe, in the Whakatāne District and Bay of Plenty Region of New Zealand's North Island.

The New Zealand Ministry for Culture and Heritage gives a translation of "place of loosening or freeing from tapu" for Ōtākiri.

A dairy factory was established in the area in 1912.

The settlement was known as Tarawera until 1928.

In 2017, the Chinese company which owned rights to water from the Otakiri Springs sought planning and regulatory permission to expand its water bottling operation. Permission was granted in June 2018. Green Party cabinet minister Eugenie Sage's involvement in the decision led to a revolt within the party.

A local crowd-funded environment group appealed the decision in 2019, with support from local iwi Ngāti Awa.

Education

The Otakiri School logo consists of Maori patterns and designs, and shows a pūkeko in front of a triangle, representing the nearby mountain of Putauaki (Mt Edgecumbe). The school's motto is "Learners Forever, Leading the Future".

The school was founded in 1920. It now consists of a field, sports turf, computer suite, library, hard court and several playgrounds, and uses the neighbouring Otakiri District Hall for assemblies, fundraising and school events.

The school hosts a Country Fair and a Calf-Club Day every spring and regular sports competitions. It alternates each year between a talent show and a school show.

Currently, there are four school houses:
Walker (Yellow) - Named after BMX rider Sarah Walker
Jackson (Green) - Named after New Zealand director Peter Jackson
McCaw (Black) - Named after the All Black captain Richie McCaw
Blake (Red) - Named after yachtsman Sir Peter Blake

Previously, there were five school houses:
Te Kanawa/T.K. (Purple) - Named after New Zealand opera singer Dame Kiri Te Kanawa
Kendall (Black) - Named after Barbara Kendall, a former New Zealand boardsailor
Mahy (Orange) - Named after New Zealand author, Margaret Mahy
Hillary (Green) - Named after Sir Edmund Hillary, a New Zealand mountaineer and explorer
Blake (Red) - Named after yachtsman Sir Peter Blake

References

Whakatane District
Populated places in the Bay of Plenty Region